Hong Sang-soo (홍상수, born 25 October 1960) is a South Korean film director and screenwriter.

Early life 
Hong's parents owned the film production company Cinetel Soul. Hong took the entrance exam and entered the theater department at Chung-Ang University in South Korea. He then studied in the United States where he received his bachelor's degree from the California College of Arts and Crafts and his master's at the School of the Art Institute of Chicago.

Career 
Hong made his directorial debut at age 35 with The Day a Pig Fell into the Well in 1996. Woman is the Future of Man (2004) was his first film to screen in competition at the Cannes Film Festival.

Hong's films have also screened at the Berlin International Film Festival, the Venice Film Festival, and the Locarno Film Festival.

He has received the Prix Un Certain Regard at the 2010 Cannes Film Festival for Hahaha, the Silver Leopard Award for Best Director at the 2013 Locarno International Film Festival for Our Sunhi, and the Golden Leopard at the 2015 Locarno International Film Festival for Right Now, Wrong Then. His 2020 film The Woman Who Ran won him the Silver Bear for Best Director at the 70th Berlin International Film Festival.

Hong's 2022 black and white film The Novelist's Film won the Silver Bear Grand Jury Prize at the Berlinale. It was described as the film that "celebrates the beauty of chance encounters, while talking about the importance of authenticity in the dishonest world of cinema" by the executive director Carlo Shatrian of the 72nd Berlin International Film Festival.

Film style 
There are certain elements that are commonly found in Hong's films. A typical Hong film highlights a theme of domestic realism with many of the scenes set on residential streets, cafes, hotels, schools, and in the stairwells of apartment buildings. Characters in the film are seen walking around the city, drinking soju, and having sex. The main characters in his films are often movie directors or actors, and scenes typically consist of a single shot, often beginning and ending with a camera zoom. The budgets for his movies average about $100,000.

Hong is often spontaneous when shooting, delivering the day's scene on the morning of the shoot and frequently changing stories while on set. He rarely prepares scripts in advance. Hong instead begins with a basic guideline and writes his scenes on the morning of the filming day, making changes throughout the day. Hong starts the filming day at 4 a.m. when he begins to write the dialogue for that day's shoot. Hong also develops close relationships with the actors over alcohol and cigarettes and sometimes shoots certain scenes while the actors are under the influence.

Hong's style has been compared to Eric Rohmer's, and it has even been argued that allusions to Rohmer's films appear in some films directed by Hong.

Personal life 

In 2016, Hong was reported to be having an extramarital affair with actress Kim Min-hee, who appeared in his 2015 film, Right Now, Wrong Then. Hong admitted to the affair in March 2017, at the Seoul premiere of On the Beach at Night Alone. He filed a divorce suit from his wife in December 2016, but the court rejected his request in June 2019, insisting that only the injured party, Hong's wife, could initiate a legal separation.

Filmography

Feature films

Short films

Awards

National awards 
 1996 17th Blue Dragon Film Awards: Best New Director (The Day a Pig Fell into the Well)
 1996 16th Korean Association of Film Critics Awards: Best New Director (The Day a Pig Fell into the Well)
 1998 19th Blue Dragon Film Awards: Best Director; Best Screenplay (The Power of Kangwon Province)
 2000 1st Busan Film Critics Awards: Best Screenplay (Virgin Stripped Bare by Her Bachelors)
 2006 9th Director's Cut Awards: Best Director (Woman on the Beach)
 2008 28th Korean Association of Film Critics Awards: Best Screenplay (Night and Day)
 2010 19th Buil Film Awards: Best Director (Hahaha)
 2013 14th Busan Film Critics Awards: Special Jury Prize (Our Sunhi)
 2014 23rd Buil Film Awards: Best Director (Our Sunhi)
 2015 2nd Wildflower Film Awards: Best Director, Narrative Films (Hill of Freedom)
 2017 Busan Film Critics Awards: Grand Prize (On the Beach at Night Alone)
 2017 Busan Film Critics Awards: Grand Prize (The Day After)
 2018 5th Wildflower Film Awards: Best Director, Narrative Films (The Day After)
 2022 Busan Film Critics Awards : Grand Prize (In Front of Your Face)

International awards 
 1996 15th Vancouver International Film Festival: Dragons and Tigers Award (The Day a Pig Fell into the Well)
 1997 42nd Asia Pacific Film Festival: Best New Director (The Day a Pig Fell into the Well)
 1997 International Film Festival Rotterdam: Tiger Award (The Day a Pig Fell into the Well)
 1999 Singapore International Film Festival: NETPAC-FIPRESCI Special Mention (The Power of Kangwon Province)
 1999 Santa Barbara International Film Festival: Burning Vision Award (The Power of Kangwon Province)
 2000 45th Asia Pacific Film Festival: Best Screenplay (Virgin Stripped Bare by Her Bachelors)
 2000 13th Tokyo International Film Festival: Special Jury Prize (Virgin Stripped Bare by Her Bachelors)
 2002 47th Asia Pacific Film Festival: Best Director (On the Occasion of Remembering the Turning Gate)
 2003 Seattle International Film Festival: Emerging Masters Showcase Award
 2007 22nd Mar del Plata International Film Festival: Best Director (Woman on the Beach)
 2010 63rd Cannes Film Festival: Prix Un Certain Regard (Hahaha)
 2011 40th International Film Festival Rotterdam: Return of the Tiger Award (Oki's Movie)
 2013 66th Locarno International Film Festival: Best Director (Our Sunhi)
 2015 68th Locarno International Film Festival: Golden Leopard (Right Now, Wrong Then)
 2016 64th San Sebastián International Film Festival: Best Director (Yourself and Yours)
 2017 Jerusalem Film Festival: Best International Film (On the Beach at Night Alone)
 2017 LA Film Festival: World Fiction Award (On the Beach at Night Alone)
 2018 Gijón International Film Festival: Winner (Hotel by the River)
 2018 Gijón International Film Festival: Best Screenplay (Hotel by the River)
 2020 70th Berlin International Film Festival: Silver Bear for Best Director (The Woman Who Ran)
 2021 71st Berlin International Film Festival: Silver Bear for Best Screenplay (Introduction)
 2021 Gijón International Film Festival: Special Jury Award (In Front of Your Face)
 2022 72nd Berlin International Film Festival: Silver Bear Grand Jury Prize (The Novelist's Film)

State honors

Notes

References

External links 

1960 births
Living people
Chung-Ang University alumni
People from Seoul
Silver Bear for Best Director recipients
Silver Bear for Best Screenplay winners
South Korean film directors
South Korean screenwriters